Yolki 6 (meaning Christmas Trees New), is a 2017 Russian comedy film, the sequel to Yolki 5. Starring Ivan Urgant, Sergey Svetlakov, Dmitry Nagiyev, Elena Yakovleva, and Yulia Aleksandrova. It was released in wide release in Russia on December 21, 2017.

The film had a mixed reception by viewers and critics. The plot, special effects and replacement actors were criticized, but the acting and humor were positively assessed. The film grossed almost 15 million dollars at the worldwide box office, with a budget of 3 million dollars. The seventh film, Yolki 7, was released in 2018.

Plot

Segment "Pines"
High-school hipster Andrei (Daniela Vakhrushev) goes to the forest with his mother's boyfriend Yuri Semyonovich (Dmitry Nagiev), employee of the Ministry of Emergency Situations, to fetch a Christmas tree. In order to strengthen their new family, Yuri teaches the boy how to survive in the wild. Some of the dangers in the forest include NATO soldiers and bears.

Segment "Pregnant Snow Maiden"
Pregnant Marina (Yuliya Aleksandrova) moonlights as Snow Maiden to earn enough money to be able to give birth in a paid hospital. Marina has broken up with the father of her unborn child because of his infidelity. She convinces a repairman from Kyrgyzstan to dress up as Santa Claus and help her in her Snow Maiden act. They travel around Nizhny Novgorod on a tractor. The "Snow Maiden" also ends up helping get a student's (Taisiya Vilkova) life in order, who is also expecting.

Segment "Doctor"
Galya (Valentina Mazunina), an overweight airport employee, steals handcuffs from her policeman father. She is unrequitedly in love with Denis (Anton Bogdanov), an attractive doctor-intensivist. Denis is romantically involved with his beautiful co-worker, and is about to propose to her.

Galya decides to literally chain herself to Denis at his place of work so that they will never be apart. Denis calls the police, but the police officer who arrives to the scene, turns out to be Galya's father who refuses to remove the handcuffs. Denis' girlfriend ends up rejecting his marriage proposal, and advises him to pursue Galya instead. After all these misadventures, Denis starts to develop romantic feelings for Galya.

Segment "Fire victims"
Evgeniy's (Sergei Svetlakov) apartment is burnt down when he attempts to bake for his family. Evgeniy, together with his family and the ill-fated bread machine, move in with his friend Boris (Ivan Urgant). The new inhabitants make a mess at the new apartment and everyone ends up feeling cramped. Evgeniy again tries to bake bread with disastrous results.

Segment "Mama"
Schoolboy Yegor (Danil Muravyov-Izotov), brought up by his widowed father Viktor (Sergei Puskepalis), puts up a video online which goes viral; in it he expresses his wish to find a new mother. He runs away from his home in Khabarovsk and flies all the way to Moscow to meet with a possible candidate - Ksenia (Ekaterina Klimova), a sentimental news anchor from the NTV channel. Despite being engaged, she ends up developing romantic feelings for Yegor's father.

Cast
Ivan Urgant - Boris Vorobyov
Sergey Svetlakov - Evgeniy
Dmitry Nagiyev - Yury Semyonovich Vnukov
Yuliya Aleksandrova - Marina, pregnant Snow Maiden
Anton Bogdanov - Denis Evgenievich, doctor
Valentina Mazunina - Galya
Elena Yakovleva  - Andrey's mother
Sergei Puskepalis - Viktor Orlov, Yegor's father
Ekaterina Klimova - Ksenia Lastochkina, TV presenter
Andrey Burkovsky - Igor, the jealous fiancé of Xenia
Anfisa Chernykh - Katya, nurse
Vladislav Vetrov
Irina Arkhipova
Alisa Sapegina - Olga, wife of Boris
Daniil Izotov - Yegor Orlov, the boy who seeks his mother
Daniil Vakhrushev - Andrey, a freshman
Taisiya Vilkova - Julia
Andrey Nazimov
Evgeniy Romantsev
Vadim Rudenko - seller of Christmas trees
Andrey Yurtaev
Vladimir Matveev - father of Evgeniy
Natalia Potapova - mother of Evgeniy
Imran Chelabiyev - son of Bori
Gennady Turantayev - Father Frost

References

External links

Films directed by Dmitriy Kiselev
Films directed by Alexander Kott
2017 films
2017 comedy films
Russian comedy films
Films set around New Year
Russian anthology films
Russian sequel films
Bazelevs Company films